Daya Bandara Tennakoon (born 29 November 1941 – died 17 April 2020 as දයා තෙන්නකෝන්) [Sinhala]), was an actor in Sri Lankan cinema, stage drama and television.

Personal life
He was born on 29 November 1941 in the small village Galabadawatta, in Rangala, Kandy. He started primary education from Galabadawatta Primary School and then completed secondary education from Dharmaraja College, Kandy. His father was a tea estate keeper. After school times, he was selected to the University of Ceylon, Peradeniya and graduated with an arts degree.

He was married to fellow actress Grace Ariyavwimal. He met Grace during the 1965 stage play Manaranjana Wedawarjana produced by Henry Jayasena.

Thennakoon died on 17 April 2020 at the age of 78 while receiving treatments at Apeksha Cancer Hospital, Maharagama. The funeral took place on Sunday 19 April at 11:00 am at Thalahena Cemetery, Malabe.

Career
While Thennakoon was studying at the University of Peradeniya, his school as well as university friend Dharmasena Pathiraja invited him to attend several discussions done with filmmaker Sugathapala Senarath Yapa, for his film script Hanthane Kathawa in 1969. Tennakoon was selected for the role "Naatha" in that film, which made his acting debut. He entered the stage through the drama Bosathaneni which was produced by Bandula Jayawardena.

He also worked as a journalist in the newspaper Lassana before entering cinema.

There were vacancies in the Ceylon Broadcasting Corporation (CBC) when he left the university where he obtained a job there. In 1969, he worked as an Operations Assistant at CBC. During this time however, he was selected for many stage dramas directed by Sugathapala de Silva including Dunnu Dunugamuwe in 1972, Satha Satha, and Pathiraja's Kora Saha Andhaya in 1970. His performance with Malini Weeramuni in Dunnu Dunugamuwe was one of the most spectacular performances the audience has ever seen. He has been mostly involved in the work of university mate Dharmasena Pathiraja. Later he involved in the play Nettukkari by Namel Weeramuni and play Hitha Honda Ammandi by De Silva.

He was promoted to producer of the radio education service. The Japanese Award for Special Evaluation of the Year was awarded in 1979 to the program Muhude Yuddhe by Thennekoon. He acted in the television serial Thattu Gewal, which gained enormous popularity. He was awarded with a merit award for his performance in the film Sakman Maluwa in 2003. Shortly thereafter, he partnered with a television production company called "Cine Video". He was involved in the creation of a number of commercials such as the National Savings Bank and DSI, which were very popular at the time. He directed a number of documentaries and teledramas for Swarnavahini in early years.

It was for the first time in Sri Lanka television that he filmed a song as his concept. It was the first video song ever made for a television media in Sri Lanka. Tennakoon is the pioneer of Sri Lankan television music videos.

He has acted in several supporting roles in many popular films such as Ahas Gawwa, Eya Dan Loku Lamayek, Seilama, Bambaru Avith, Karumakkarayo, Kinihiriya Mal, Sakman Maluwa, Soldadu Unnehe, Swaroopa, Dedunu Akase and 28.

Selected stage plays
 Bosathaneni
 Deegeka Awith Kandoskiriyawa 
 Dunnu Dunugamuwe
 Esala Sandaha Awanhala
 Hitha Honda Ammandi
 Kora Saha Andhaya
 Muthu Kumari
 Nettukkari
 Satha Satha
 The Dictator

Selected television serials
 Andukola 
 Anuththara 
 Hathe Kalliya 
 Pinketha
 Sansungama Andaraya 
 Thattu Gewal
 Wes

Awards
He has received several awards.

 1st FIPRESCT Critics Award 1994 for the Best Performance - Tharanaya
 7th Swarna Sanka Cinema Awards 1996 for the Best Supporting Actor - Seilama
 26th Sarasaviya Award 1998 for the Best Performance - Tharanaya

Filmography

References

External links
දයා තෙන්නකෝන් කලාකරුවාත් සමුගනී
රංගන ශිල්පී දයා තෙන්නකෝන් අභාවප්‍රාප්ත වෙයි
දයා තෙන්නකෝන් සමුගනී
ප්‍රවීන රංගන ශිල්පී දයා තෙන්නකෝන් මහතා අභාවප්‍රාප්ත වෙයි
රංගන ශිල්පී දයා තෙන්නකෝන් දිවියෙන් සමුගනියි
About Daya Thennakoon's death
Return of the Dictator
He became my husband - Grace
ටික දිනකට දිව්‍ය ලෝකයට
Art World with Daya Thennekoon

Sri Lankan male film actors
Sinhalese male actors
1941 births
2020 deaths
Alumni of Dharmaraja College